Leptomyrina makala is a butterfly in the family Lycaenidae. It is found in Kivu in the Democratic Republic of the Congo and in western Uganda.

References

External links
Die Gross-Schmetterlinge der Erde 13: Die Afrikanischen Tagfalter. Plate XIII 65 k

Butterflies described in 1908
Hypolycaenini
Lepidoptera of Uganda
Lepidoptera of the Democratic Republic of the Congo